Urban Acman (born 28 March 1976) is a retired Slovenian sprinter. He competed in the men's 4 × 100 metres relay at the 2000 Summer Olympics.

Personal bests

All information taken from the athlete's World Athletics profile.

References

External links
 

1976 births
Living people
Athletes (track and field) at the 2000 Summer Olympics
Slovenian male sprinters
Olympic athletes of Slovenia